Abeer, Abir, Aviri (Arabic: عبير‎) is a feminine name of Arabic origin. "Abeer" means fragrance, aroma, perfume or scent.

Notable people
 Abeer Abdelrahman, Egyptian weightlifter
 Abeer Abu Ghaith (born c. 1985), Palestinian technology entrepreneur, and social activist.
 Abeer Al-Janaby, Iraqi girl killed by United States forces in the Mahmudiyah rape and killings 
 Abeer Al-Nahar, Jordanian footballer
 Abeer Alwan, American electrical engineer and speech processing researcher 
 Abeer Essawy, Egyptian taekwondo practitioner
 Abeer Hamza, Egyptian lecturer
 Abeer Issa, Jordanian actress
Abeer MacIntyre (born 1964), British-Jordanian radio and television presenter
 Abeer Nehme (born 1980), Lebanese singer
 Abeer Odeh (born 1962), Palestinian politician 
 Abeer Rantisi, Jordanian footballer 
 Abeer Seikaly, Jordanian-Canadian architect
 Abeer bint Abdullah Al Saud, Saudi royal

See also
Abir (disambiguation)

References

Arabic feminine given names